The 2016 Tulsa Golden Hurricane men's soccer team represented the University of Tulsa during the 2016 NCAA Division I men's soccer season. It was the program's 37th season.

Before the season

Transfers out / departures
Adrian Smart transferred to Bloomfield College. Jordan Speed transferred to Midwestern State. Geoffrey Dee transferred to Louisville. Aymar Sigue transferred to Penn State. Zach Jackson transferred to Furman. Tony Doellefeld transferred to Belmont. Kyle Daledovich transferred to South Dakota Mines.

Roster

Schedule

Exhibition

Regular season

AAC tournament

NCAA tournament

Rankings

References

External links
2016 Tulsa Soccer Media Guide

Tulsa
Tulsa Golden Hurricane, Soccer
Tulsa
2016